Tómas Sæmundsson (7 June 1807 – 17 May 1841) was an Icelandic priest, and one of the Fjölnismenn, a group of Icelandic intellectuals who spearheaded the revival of Icelandic national consciousness and gave rise to the Icelandic Independence Movement. According to author Daisy Neijmann, he was "one of the era's most fervent nationalists".

Tómas is quoted by J. R. R. Tolkien as saying "Málin eru höfuðeínkenni þjóðanna..." (Languages are the chief distinguishing marks of peoples ...): 

Tómas travelled around Europe from 1832 to 1834, and he became the pastor in Breiðabólsstaður in Fljótshlíð in 1835. Among other things, Tómas wrote the fifth annual issue of the journal Fjölnir.

References

External links
Tómas Sæmundsson; grein í Lesbók Morgunblaðsins 1941
Tómas Sæmundsson; minningargrein í Fjölni 1843

Saemundsson, Tomas
Saemundsson, Tomas
Icelandic writers
Icelandic priests
19th-century Icelandic people
Icelandic independence activists